Idée fixe may refer to:

 Idée fixe (psychology), a psychological disorder
 Idée Fixe (album), an album by Aerolit
 Dogmatix, the English name of an Asterix comics character, called Idéfix in French
 Leitmotif, a recurring musical phrase used as an element of musical structure.

See also
 Fixation (disambiguation)